Tomáš Černý (born 10 April 1985) is a Czech retired professional footballer who played as a goalkeeper. Černý has played football in the Czech Republic, Scotland, Bulgaria and Greece for Sigma Olomouc, Hamilton Academical, CSKA Sofia, Ergotelis, Hibernian, Partick Thistle and Aberdeen respectively. He has also played youth international football for the Czech Republic.

Club career

Sigma Olomouc 
Born in Ústí nad Labem, Černý started his career at Sigma Olomouc in 2002, was outstanding player in the youth set-up, but he made only one senior appearance for the club, playing in a 0–0 draw against Příbram on 12 March 2005.

Hamilton Academical 
He signed on loan for Scottish First Division side Hamilton Academical in August 2007. Černý helped Hamilton achieve promotion to the Scottish Premier League in 2008. Černý won the SPL Player of the Month Award in January 2009. In March 2009, Černý announced his desire to stay with the Accies after his loan spell ended. On 24 April 2009, Černý signed a two-year permanent contract with Hamilton and completed a transfer from Sigma Olomouc for a fee of 200.000 Euro after attracting interest from Glasgow Celtic and Glasgow Rangers. Tomas played 155 official games for the club.  Tomas was recognised as Hamilton Academical's Player of the Year for 2008–2009. On 17 February 2012, Černý's contract was terminated by mutual consent.

CSKA Sofia 
On 26 June 2012, Černý joined Bulgarian club CSKA Sofia. He made his competitive debut in a 0–0 draw against Mura 05 in the second qualifying round of Europa League on 19 July. His A Group debut came on 11 August, in the 1–0 away loss against Litex Lovech. Černý was the undisputed number one goalkeeper for a period of more than a year and during that time racked up an impressive tally of 32 clean sheets in 57 official games. However, in late 2013, Černý lost his place in the starting line-up due to refusing to extend his contract with the club over lack of payment.

Ergotelis 
On 6 July 2014, Černý signed a two-year contract with Greek Super League club Ergotelis.

Hibernian 
On 26 January 2015, Černý moved to Hibernian, signing a contract until the end of the 2014–15. He left the club at the end of his contract.

Partick Thistle 

Černý signed a one-year contract with Scottish Premiership club Partick Thistle in June 2015. He played regularly for Thistle in the early part of the 2015–16 season, and manager Alan Archibald said he was the team's best player during this period. Černý suffered an ankle injury in October. On 22 January 2016, Černý signed a contract extension keeping him at Firhill Stadium until the summer of 2018.

On 8 May 2016, the day after Thistle secured their top flight status with a 2–0 away win to Kilmarnock, Černy was voted Partick Thistle's player of the year at a ceremony in the Crowne Plaza in Glasgow.

In July 2017, he extended his contract with Thistle to the summer of 2019. After Thistle were relegated from the Premiership in May 2018, Černy exercised a clause in his contract that allowed him to become a free agent.

Aberdeen
Černy signed a one-year contract with Aberdeen in July 2018. He extended his stay for another year in May 2019. He again signed a new one-year deal in July 2020.
On 14 January 2021, Černy departed Aberdeen, also confirming his retirement from professional football. He confirmed that he would be training as a physical education teacher, looking to work in the northeast of Scotland, having settled in the area with his family.

International career 
Černý was a member of the Czech under-17, under-18, under-19 and under-21 teams, being capped 23 times U17-U19 and 5 times U21 at national level. During his international career, Černý played alongside the likes of Michal Kadlec and Tomáš Sivok. Černý was part of the U-19 Czech Republic team that won Bronze at the European Championships in 2003. During this tournament, Černý kept a clean sheet against England in a 3:0 win.

Personal life 
Černý married his Scottish wife Laura in June 2013, after meeting her during his time playing for Hamilton Accies.

When Černý moved to Scotland in 2007, he spoke little English and after a year of learning the language, enrolled in a Psychology degree with the Open University. Černý also became involved in the Scottish reading stars initiative in 2014.

Career statistics

Honours

Individual 
 Scottish Premier League Player of the Month – January 2009
 Partick Thistle Player of The Year – 2016 
 Hamilton Academical Player of the Year – 2009

Team 
 European Championships U19 Bronze Medal
 Scottish Championship Winner 2008

References 

1985 births
Sportspeople from Ústí nad Labem
Living people
Czech footballers
Czech Republic youth international footballers
Czech Republic under-21 international footballers
Czech expatriate footballers
Expatriate footballers in Scotland
Expatriate footballers in Bulgaria
Association football goalkeepers
Czech First League players
Scottish Football League players
Scottish Premier League players
Scottish Professional Football League players
First Professional Football League (Bulgaria) players
SK Sigma Olomouc players
Hamilton Academical F.C. players
PFC CSKA Sofia players
Ergotelis F.C. players
Hibernian F.C. players
Partick Thistle F.C. players
Aberdeen F.C. players